The Bs was an occasional team that played first-class cricket in the first half of the 19th century in matches against All-England and Marylebone Cricket Club (MCC). The team ostensibly consisted of players whose surname began with the letter B given that there were numerous top-class players at that time who qualified: e.g., William Beldham, Lord Frederick Beauclerk and Jem Broadbridge. However, there were instances of the team including given men. The Bs is first recorded in the 1805 season and the team was raised sporadically until the 1832 season.

The Bs achieved unwanted fame in June 1810 when they played All-England at Lord's Old Ground and were dismissed for only 6 in their second innings, enabling All-England to win the match by 6 wickets. This is the world record for the lowest innings total in first-class cricket.  Curiously, four of the six runs were scored by John Wells and another one was scored by James Lawrell, these being the two given men as only nine Bs could take part. The only B to score a run was Samuel Bridger.

Despite the 1810 setback, the Bs had a reasonable record and defeated All-England in 1805, 1822, 1823 and 1824.

References

Organizations established in 1805
Sports clubs established in the 1800s
English cricket in the 19th century
Former senior cricket clubs
1805 establishments in England